Edward Lynn "Eddie" Fiola (born Sep 28, 1964) is an American former professional freestyle BMX rider, and a film stuntman.

In 1982 Bob Morales started up the ASPA (Amateur Skatepark Association which would later become the AFA or American Freestyle Association) and began the legendary king of the skateparks competitions in the USA. Eddie Fiola would go on to win it a total of 5 times along with 4 freestyle Nora (Number One Rider Award) cups including the first one ever to be awarded in 1985 and with having the idea for the potts modification or hollow stem bolt. This led to him becoming one of the most famous and highly paid freestyle BMX riders of his time reputedly earning around $100,000 dollars in a year and appearing on the cover of countless magazines. Later he became a stuntman in films such as The Dukes of Hazzard, The Italian Job and Indiana Jones and the Kingdom of the Crystal Skull.

Career in BMX

In 1982 Haro Bikes rider Bob Morales helped with a deal to get Fiola on the team, however determined to go it alone they both leave Haro and sign for Kuwahara to help design and promote the E.T. the Extra-Terrestrial BMX bike at the end of the year. Fiola wins the first 16+ expert class in the King of the Skateparks.

In 1983 after leaving Kuwahara (bicycle company) he signs for GT Bicycles alongside Bob Morales and then goes on to co design with Morales one of the most iconic BMX freestyle frames, the GT Performer. He performs a show with Bob Morales at the Super Bowl of motorcross in the Anaheim Stadium in front of 40,000 people. He is a judge for the World Amateur Championship of BMX and wins the 17+ expert class King of the Skateparks series.

In 1984 he becomes the first member of the renamed ASPA which is now known as the AFA. He wins the GT-BMX summer freestyle championship in Venice beach California and visits the UK to take part in the televised Kellogg’s freestyle BMX competition alongside fellow country man and main competitor in the King of the Skateparks series Mike Dominguez. He wins the series with the commentator naming him “the flying banana” due to his all yellow bike and apparel with “TRIX R 4 KIDZ” printed on the backside of his pants. Just after he visits Livingston skatepark with Dominguez for an article in BMX Action bike magazine and is interviewed for the Edinburgh Evening News. Later he visits Paris for a demonstration with fellow American freestyler R. L. Osborn at the 1st Bicross International in the Palais Omnisports de Paris-Bercy arena. He wins the first pro class at King of the Skateparks series, also winning the BMX Plus! and BMX Action bike magazine freestyler of the year.

In 1985 he embarks on the GT freestyle world tour alongside fellow GT rider Dave Breed visiting 15 countries (Saudi Arabia, Japan, Australia, England, Ireland, Northern Ireland, Wales, Scotland, France, Belgium, the Netherlands, West Germany, Denmark, Sweden and the United States, including Hawaii) over a 3-month period from May through July performing shows and making television appearances. Whilst on tour he enters the second UK Kellogg’s Frosties televised competition finishing 4th overall. He appears in the Freestyles Raddest Tricks video and wins the Freesytlin’ magazines NORA cup and the BMX Plus! freestyler of the year. He finishes 2nd in the King of the Skatepark series to his great rival Mike Dominguez.

In 1986 he is hired as a technical advisor and stunt rider on the Hal Needham film Rad with actor Bill Allen having to dye his hair to match Fiolas. It is said that the film is loosely based around Fiolas life.   He stars in the GTV video and is one of the riders in RAD TV: The Sequel video. He wins a controversial IBMXF Freestyle World Championships in Vancouver and finishes 2nd overall in the AFA Masters Series. He becomes the BMX Plus! freestyler rider of the year and wins the Freestylin’ magazine NORA cup. He also wins the pro class King of the Skateparks series, the last one ever to be held.

In 1987 he takes part in the GT Demo tape video and then leaves GT and signs a deal to promote Citicat bikes which is shortened due to production problems.  He takes part in the 101 freestyle tricks video.

In 1988 he is testing bikes for BMX Plus! magazine. 

In 1990 he is riding for Vans and Bully touring with Josh White and Scotty Freeman.

In 1992 he is still doing shows with some support from GT and Vans.

In 2004 he hooks up with Redline BMX.

In 2005 he is interviewed in the film Joe Kid on a Stingray, the history of BMX.

In 2006 he performs a July 4 BMX show with Todd Anderson in Orange County, California.

In 2008 he is awarded with a white GT pro Performer at the OS-BMX gathering as a tribute to his achievements.

In 2009 he is inducted into the American Bicycle Association (ABA) Hall of Fame (Freestyle Pioneer) He also takes part in the OS-BMX Old School Reunion 2009 at Peck Park California

In 2010 he takes part in the old school reunion at Woodward West camp in California. He is riding Faction 22" BMX bikes and part of their test team.

In 2011, he appeared on the front cover of Classic BMX Magazine issue 6 with an interview inside.

In 2012, he is a performer in Gale Webb Extreme Sports and Air Shows in California. He launches his own website.

In 2013, he launches his own frame and handlebar combo called the EF|Proformer, limited to 250 sets.

Personal life

Fiola married Mindi Neill on his birthday in 1991. They have one daughter named Audrey. On December 14, 2021, Fiola announced his biography was in the works and the book was being written by lifelong fan and author Billy Henrickle.

Film and television credits
Stunt work

 Contraband (2012 film) (2012)
 Paul (film) (2011)
 The Birth of Big Air (2010)
 The Cape (2010)
 The Hangover (2009)
 Where the Wild Things Are (2009)
 Indiana Jones and the Kingdom of the Crystal Skull (2008)
 "Fear Factor" (2006)
 The Dukes of Hazzard (2005)
 Buffalo Dreams (2005)
 The Cat in the Hat (2003)
 The Italian Job (2003)
 Biker Boyz (2003)
 American Icarus (2002)
 Jackass: The Movie (2002)
 Redemption (2002)
 The One (2001)
 Max Keeble's Big Move (2001)
 Crazy/Beautiful (2001)
 The Base (1999)
 From Dusk Till Dawn 2: Texas Blood Money (1999)
 I Got the Hook Up (1998)
 Slappy and the Stinkers (1998)
 The Company Man (1998)
 The Maker (1997)
 Bean (1997)
 The Pest (1997)
 Prey of the Jaguar (1996)
 The Paper Brigade (1996)
 Spy Hard (1996)
 The Secret Agent Club (1996)
 Rage (1995)
 Radioland Murders (1994)
 Rad (1986)

Acting
 Walker, Texas Ranger TV episode x2
 From Dusk Till Dawn 2: Texas Blood Money (1999)
Self
 The Birth of Big Air (2010)
 Joe Kid on a Stingray (2005)
 Pacific Blue, television series

References

External links
 Fiola's Facebook page
 Interview on BMX Freestyler
 ROOTS interview on Vital BMX
 King of the Skateparks 1984
 King of the Skateparks run 1985 pulling 540 video
 Fiola and RL Oborne at Bicross International video
 Video interview with OS-BMX
 On British TVAM program Wacaday
 List of Credits at Hollywood.com
 Video from Huntington beach 1984 on grindtv
 Fiola rides his Zeitgeist 22" Bike
 https://web.archive.org/web/20130423115636/http://eddiefiola.co/index2.php#/home

1954 births
American male cyclists
American stunt performers
BMX riders
Living people